Pternozyga haeretica is a species of moth of the  family Tortricidae. It is found in India, where it has been recorded from the Palni Hills and the Nilgiri mountains.

References

	

Moths described in 1908
Archipini